This is a tally of newspaper and magazine endorsements in the 2011 Canadian federal election.

Endorsing the Conservative Party

Endorsing the New Democratic Party

Endorsing the Liberal Party

Endorsing the Bloc Québécois

Endorsing multiple parties

Explicitly endorsing no party

See also
Newspaper endorsements in the Canadian federal election, 2015
Newspaper endorsements in the Canadian federal election, 2008
Newspaper endorsements in the Canadian federal election, 2006

References 

2011 Canadian federal election
Canada 2011
Federal elections, 2011